Pailhès may refer to the following places in France:

Pailhès, Ariège, a commune in the Ariège department 
Pailhès, Hérault, a commune in the Hérault department 

oc:Palhèrs